Blue Apron Inc. is an American ingredient-and-recipe meal kit company headquartered in New York City, operating its services exclusively in the United States. It offers weekly boxes containing ingredients, which also includes suggested recipes that must be cooked by hand by the customer using the pre-ordered ingredients.

As of September 2016, the company had shipped 8 million meal servings.  In June 2017, the company went public with an initial public offering.

History

Matt Salzberg, Ilia Papas and Matt Wadiak first began sending customers boxes containing the ingredients to cook recipes in August 2012, packing and shipping the first 30 orders themselves from a commercial kitchen in Long Island City. In May 2014, the company announced that it would be launching a fulfillment center in Richmond, California. In November 2014, Blue Apron launched Blue Apron Market, a store featuring kitchen tools and cookware. In December 2014, the company opened another fulfillment center in Jersey City, New Jersey.

After the opening of its third fulfillment center in Arlington, Texas in June 2015, the company began shipping to the contiguous United States.

In September 2015, Blue Apron launched Blue Apron Wine, a direct-to-consumer wine delivery service that sends customers six 500 ml bottles per month. The wines, made specifically for Blue Apron, are purchased directly from vineyards and sent directly to customers.

In October 2016, BuzzFeed reported a history of safety and health violations at the company's Richmond, California distribution center.  The company attributed the problems to operational issues while scaling up during its early days.

In February 2017, the company announced  that it would be opening a fulfillment center in Linden, New Jersey.

On June 29, 2017, Blue Apron had its initial public offering of 30 million shares of class A common stock (ticker APRN) priced at $10 per share; it is the first U.S. meal-kit company to go public.

Since going public, Wall Street has cut Blue Apron's stock price in half. By October 2017, prior to its next earnings report, the company had announced a company-wide realignment, 6% of employees laid off at both the corporate offices and fulfillment centers, estimated to be a couple of hundred jobs.

On November 30, 2017, Blue Apron announced that Brad Dickerson would be replacing Salzberg as CEO; Salzberg will remain chairman.

As of March 26, 2018, Blue Apron has lost 81.4% of its market value since its initial public offering.

In May 2018, Blue Apron began selling 4 servings meal kits at 17 Costco locations in California, marking the company's entrance into physical retail and Tim Bensley, formerly of Acosta Sales & Marketing, entered as CFO.

On August 2, 2018, Blue Apron, announced the total number of customers who paid for a meal delivery had a decrease of 24 percent during the second quarter of 2018 compared to the previous quarter, and the company also indicated total orders had slipped by 23 percent.

In April 2019, Brad Dickerson was succeeded by Linda Findley Kozlowski as the new CEO of the company. However, Dickerson remained at the company as an adviser.

In November 2020, Alan Blake was succeeded by Charlean Gmunder as the new COO. Blake left the company in June to lead operations at Kettle Cuisine.

Environmental impact
The company and other meal kit companies have been criticized for creating excess packaging waste from the individually packaged ingredients. As of 2017, Blue Apron partners with farms that limit agricultural chemicals and promote soil health through crop rotation to grow specialty crops for the company.

References

External links 

 
 

2017 initial public offerings
Companies listed on the New York Stock Exchange
Online food retailers of the United States
American companies established in 2012
Retail companies established in 2012
Transport companies established in 2012
Internet properties established in 2012
Publicly traded companies based in New York City
Subscription services
2012 establishments in New York (state)